This list of history awards covers notable awards given to persons, a group of persons, or institutions, for their contribution to the study of history. It is organized by region. The entries name the prize and sponsoring organization, give notes on the purpose or criteria, and where available give the period in which the prize was awarded. Typically a prize is first awarded in the year after it is established, and applies to work published in the previous year.

Americas

Canada

Latin America

United States

Asia

Europe

Oceania

Australia

See also
 Lists of awards

References

 
history